Ten, Nine, Eight is a children's picture book by Molly Bang, published in 1983. It is a countdown from ten to one by a little girl who is getting ready for bed. Barney the Dinosaur read this book on the Barney & Friends episode "Having Tens of Fun!" This book won the Caldecott Honor.

References

Caldecott Honor-winning works
1983 children's books
American picture books